Placentelidae is a family of tunicates belonging to the order Aplousobranchia. It contains a single genus, Placentela.

References

Aplousobranchia
Tunicate genera